Mark Smith (born ) was a pioneer in radio-controlled (R/C) model aviation. The son of Rod Smith, an early inventor of R/C equipment, Mark began building hand-launch gliders in the 6th or 7th grade. In his teens he followed his father's footsteps into R/C gliders. He later went on to designing R/C gliders like his 100-inch-wingspan Windfree along with the 72-inch-wingspan Wanderer which were the best-sellers for decades. In the early 1970s he built radio-controlled seagulls for the 1972 movie Jonathan Livingston Seagull.

In 1973, he set a new long-distance flying world record. His radio-controlled glider stayed in the air for thirteen hours, travelling for a total of 286 miles in 2286 laps around two pylons set 100m apart.

Smith was from Escondido, California.

References

1950 births
Possibly living people
Engineers from California
People from Escondido, California